California's Golden Beginning is a 1948 short film directed by Cecil B. DeMille. It was preserved by the Academy Film Archive in 2010.

Cast
 John Eldredge
 Louis Jean Heydt
 Harold Vermilyea
 Lane Chandler
 Will Wright
 Irving Bacon

References

External links

1948 films
1948 short films
Films directed by Cecil B. DeMille
American short films
Paramount Pictures short films
1940s English-language films